Lee Do-Kweon (born 8 August 1979) is a South Korean football player.

Lee made seven Hungarian NB I appearances for Újpest FC during the 2007–08 season. He also played domestically for Icheon Sangmu (while he was in the army), Goyang KB Kookmin Bank, Jeonbuk Hyundai Motors, Gangneung City FC and Gimhae City FC.

References

 K-League Player Record 
 N-League Player Record - 이도권 

1979 births
Living people
Association football midfielders
South Korean footballers
South Korean expatriate footballers
Gimcheon Sangmu FC players
Jeonbuk Hyundai Motors players
Újpest FC players
Gangneung City FC players
Korea National League players
K League 1 players
Expatriate footballers in Hungary
South Korean expatriate sportspeople in Hungary